The 133rd Pennsylvania House of Representatives District is located in Southeastern Pennsylvania and has been represented since a special election in 2018 by Jeanne McNeill.

District profile
The 133rd Pennsylvania House of Representatives District is located within Lehigh County. It is made up of the following areas:

 Bethlehem (Lehigh County portion)
 Catasauqua
 Coplay
 Fountain Hill
 Hanover Township
 Whitehall Township

Representatives

Recent election results

2010

2012

2014

2016

2017 special election

2018

2020

2022

References

External links
District map from the United States Census Bureau
Pennsylvania House Legislative District Maps from the Pennsylvania Redistricting Commission.  
Population Data for District 133 from the Pennsylvania Redistricting Commission.

Government of Lehigh County, Pennsylvania
133